This is a list of football clubs located in Vojvodina, Serbia and the leagues and divisions they play in 2014–15 season, as well as some other notable football clubs that play in the Serbian football league system.

Superliga (Top tier)

 FK Donji Srem
 FK Spartak Zlatibor Voda
 FK Vojvodina

Prva liga (Second tier)

 FK Bačka Bačka Palanka
 FK Inđija
 FK Proleter Novi Sad

Serbian League Vojvodina (Third tier)

 FK Banat Zrenjanin
 FK Bačka 1901
 FK Cement Beočin
 FK ČSK Pivara
 FK Dinamo Pančevo
 FK Dolina Padina
 FK Dunav Stari Banovci
 FK Palić
 FK PIK Prigrevica
 FK Radnički Nova Pazova
 FK Radnički Sombor
 FK Radnički Sremska Mitrovica
 FK Radnički Šid
 FK Senta
 FK Sloga Temerin
 FK Vršac

Zone Leagues (Fourth tier)

Banat Zone League
 FK Borac Sakule
 FK Borac Starčevo
 FK Budućnost Srpska Crnja
 FK Crvena Zvezda Rusko Selo
 FK Jedinstvo Banatsko Karađorđevo
 FK Jedinstvo Novi Bečej
 OFK Kikinda
 FK Kozara Banatsko Veliko Selo
 FK Mladost Bambi Lukićevo
 FK Proleter Banatski Karlovac
 FK Radnički Kovin
 FK Radnički Sutjeska
 FK Sloboda Novi Kozarci
 FK Sloga Plandište
 OFK Vršac United
 FK Železničar Pančevo

Bačka Zone League
 FK Bačka Pačir
 FK Jadran Feketić
 OFK Mladost Apatin
 OFK Odžaci
 FK Olimpija Gunaroš
 FK Polet Sivac
 FK Preporod Novi Žednik
 FK Srbobran
 FK Subotica
 FK Tavankut
 FK Tekstilac Odžaci
 FK Tisa Adorjan
 FK TSC Bačka Topola
 OFK Vrbas
 FK Zadrugar Srpski Miletić
 FK ŽAK Sombor

Novi Sad-Syrmia Zone League
 FK Borac Novi Sad
 FK Budućnost Gložan
 FK Crvena Zvezda Novi Sad
 FK Graničar 1924 Adaševci
 FK Hajduk Beška
 FK Indeks Novi Sad
 FK Jedinstvo Stara Pazova
 OFK Jugović Kać
 FK Kabel
 FK Kupinovo
 FK LSK Laćarak
 FK Mladost Bački Jarak
 FK Novi Sad
 FK Omladinac Novi Banovci
 FK Sloga Erdevik
 FK ŽSK Žabalj

Područne lige (Fifth tier) (2013–14)

PFL Pančevo
 FK BAK Bela Crkva
 FK Budućnost Alibunar
 FK Crvena Zvezda Pavliš
 FK Jugoslavija Jabuka
 FK Kolonija Kovin
 FK Mladost Omoljica
 FK Partizan Gaj
 FK Polet Izbište
 FK Radnički Baranda
 FK Slavija Kovačica
 FK Sloga Banatsko Novo Selo
 FK Sloga Plandište
 FK Tempo Sefkerin
 FK Vojvodina Crepaja
 FK Vulturul Grebenac
 FK Železničar Pančevo

PFL Subotica
 FK AFK Ada
 FK Bajša
 FK Bačka Mol
 FK Čantavir
 FK Čoka
 FK Jadran Feketić
 FK Krivaja
 FK Njegoš Lovćenac
 FK Olimpija Gunaroš
 FK Olimpija Totovo Selo
 FK Panonija IM Topola
 FK Preporod Novi Žednik
 FK Proleter Njegoševo
 FK Subotica
 FK Tavankut
 FK Vinogradar Hajdukovo

PFL Zrenjanin
 FK Begej Žitište
 FK Borac Aleksandrovo
 FK Crvena Zvezda Vojvoda Stepa
 FK Jedinstvo Bočar
 FK Krajina Krajišnik
 FK Mladost Bambi Lukićevo
 FK Naftagas Elemir
 FK Omladinac Ravni Topolovac
 FK Potisje Knićanin
 FK Radnički Sutjeska
 FK Radnički Zrenjanin
 FK Rusanda Melenci
 FK Vojvodina Bašaid
 FK Vojvodina Novo Miloševo
 FK Vojvodina Perlez
 FK Zadrugar Lazarevo

PFL Novi Sad
 FK Borac Šajkaš
 FK Budućnost Gložan
 FK Budućnost Mladenovo
 FK Jedinstvo Rumenka
 FK Kabel
 FK Mladost Bački Petrovac
 FK Mladost Novi Sad
 FK Mladost Turija
 FK Petrovaradin
 FK Sutjeska Bačko Dobro Polje
 FK TSK Temerin
 FK Tvrđava Bač
 FK Veternik
 FK Vojvodina Bačko Gradište
 FK Vojvodina Tovariševo
 FK ŽSK Žabalj

PFL Sombor
 FK Borac Bački Gračac
 FK BSK Bački Brestovac
 FK Crvenka
 FK Graničar Gakovo
 FK Hajduk Stapar
 FK Kordun Kljajićevo
 FK Kula
 OFK Mladost Apatin
 OFK Odžaci
 FK Omladinac Bukovac
 FK Omladinac Deronje
 FK Polet Karavukovo
 FK Sloga Čonoplja
 FK Zadrugar Srpski Miletić
 FK ŽAK Sombor

PFL Sremska Mitrovica
 FK 1. Maj Agroruma
 FK Budućnost Salaš Noćajski
 FK Donji Petrovci
 FK Hajduk Višnjičevo
 FK Hajduk 1932 Šimanovci
 FK Hrtkovci
 FK Jadran Golubinci
 FK Kupinovo
 FK Ljukovo
 FK LSK Laćarak
 FK Partizan Vitojevci
 FK Radnički Irig
 FK Rudar Vrdnik
 FK Sloven Ruma
 FK Sremac Vojka
 FK Železničar Inđija

Others



0-9
 FK 1. Oktobar Srpski Itebej
 FK 2. Oktobar Kumane

A
 FK AS Kačarevo
 FK ASK Aradac
 FK AFK Ada

B
 FK Bačka Begeč
 FK Bečej 1908
 FK Borac Iđoš
 FK Borac Klenak
 FK Borac Rakovac
 FK Borac Veliko Središte
 FK Borac Stejanovci
 OFK Bosut
 OFK Brestač
 FK Budućnost Banatski Dvor
 FK Budućnost Savino Selo

C
 FK Čenej

D
 FK Delija Mokrin
 FK Dinamo Sonta
 FK Dobrica
 FK Dunav Bački Monoštor
 FK Dunav Banatska Palanka

E
 FK Eđšeg Mali Iđoš
 FK Elektrovojvodina Subotica

F
 FK Fruškogorac Mali Radinci
 FK Fruškogorac Manđelos
 FK Fruškogorac Sremska Kamenica
 OFK Futog

G
 FK Glogonj

H
 FK Hajdučica
 FK Hajduk Bačko Dušanovo
 FK Hajduk Čurug
 FK Hajduk Divoš
 OFK Hajduk Kula
 FK Hercegovac Gajdobra

J
 FK Jedinstvo Ečka
 FK Jedinstvo Ljuba
 FK Jedinstvo Morović
 FK Jedinstvo Ruma
 FK Jedinstvo Stević Kačarevo

K
 OFK Klek
 FK Krila Krajine
 FK Krivanj
 FK Krušedol
 FK Kulpin

L
 FK Lipar

M
 FK Maglić
 FK Mićunovo
 FK Mitros Sremska Mitrovica
 FK Mladost Banatski Despotovac
 FK Mladost 1952 Gornja Rogatica
 FK Mladost Kruščić
 FK Mladost Vojlovica
 FK Mladost Radost Srbobran

N
 FK Naftagas Boka
 FK Napredak Banatska Topola
 FK Napredak Čestereg
 FK Napredak Popinci
 FK Napredak Žarkovac

O
 FK Obilić Novi Kneževac
 FK Obilić Zmajevo
 FK Omladinac Deliblato
 FK Omladinac Opovo

P
 FK Plavi Dunav 
 FK Podrinje Mačvanska Mitrovica
 FK Podunavac Belegiš
 FK Polet Idvor
 FK Polet Nakovo
 FK Potisje Kanjiža
 FK Proleter Banoštor
 FK Proleter Neuzina
 FK Proleter Ravno Selo
 FK Proleter 2006 Zrenjanin
 FK PSK Putinci

R
 FK Radnički 1905 Bajmok
 FK Radnički 1918 Ratkovo
 FK Ratar Kruščica
 FK Rusin Ruski Krstur

S
 FK Šajkaš 1908 Kovilj
 FK Ševac Kusić
 OFK Sirig
 FK Slavija Novi Sad
 FK Sloga Ostojićevo
 FK Sofeks Futog
 FK Spartak Debeljača
 FK Sremac Čerević
 FK Stari Tamiš
 FK Strela Ivanovo
 FK Susek

T
 FK Tatra Kisač
 FK Terekves Hetin
 FK Tisa Padej
 FK Titel

U
 FK Unirea Uzdin

V
 FK Vajska
 FK Vinogradar Ledinci
 FK Vojvodina Crvena Crkva

Z
 FK ŽAK Kikinda
 OFK Zeka Buljubaša Ravnje
 FK Železničar Novi Sad
 FK Zrinjski 1932 Subotica

See also 
 List of football clubs in Serbia

External links
 Serbian Superliga  
 Prva Liga 
 Srpska Liga 
 Zonska Liga 

 
Football in Vojvodina
Serbia, Vojvodina
Clubs in Vojvodina